Angelos Basinas (born 3 January 1976) is a Greek former professional footballer who played as a defensive midfielder. He could also operate as a central midfielder and a centre back. He is best remembered for his key role in the Greece national team that won the 2004 European Championship. He provided the corner kick through which Angelos Charisteas scored the winning goal in the final against Portugal.

Club career

Panathinaikos
Basinas started his career with Greek side Panathinaikos, during his time at Panathinaikos he won both the league and the Greek Cup in 2004.
After a row broke out between Basinas, the manager and the Panathinaikos board over wages, Basinas was released on 21 September 2005, which brought an end to a career at the club which lasted over ten years, during this time he made over 150 appearances for the club scoring many crucial goals both domestically and in European competitions. ( He played 153 games (26 goals, five assists) with the club in all competitions).

Mallorca
Although rumored to go to Birmingham City, Everton, AEK Athens and Olympiacos during the 2006 winter transfer window, Basinas signed a contract with Mallorca preferring to leave Greece and join the Spanish Primera División.

In the second half of the 2005–06 season, Basinas completed a successful first period at Mallorca, helping to save the team from relegation proving a key part of the struggling team's survival.
In his second year at the club he helped the team to finish in seventh position, one point from European qualification.

He was released by Mallorca on 1 July 2008 after his -year contract came to an end. He played 81 games (one goal, one assist) with the club in all competitions.

AEK Athens
On 31 July 2008, Basinas signed a three-year contract of €1.4 million per annum with AEK Athens, choosing the number 14. Despite the pre-season odds, AEK underachieved during the first half of the season and lost the title race too early, making Basinas favourable towards a new move during the winter transfer period.

Portsmouth
On 2 February 2009, Portsmouth confirmed the signing of Basinas on an eighteen-month contract. He made his debut for Portsmouth on 7 February 2009 against Liverpool. Just a few hours after his debut, manager Tony Adams, who brought Basinas in, was sacked by the club and replaced by Paul Hart. Under the new manager, Basinas hardly played and was benched for the rest of the season after only making three appearances for Portsmouth. Despite little playing time in his first season at Portsmouth, Basinas stated that he wanted to stay at the club. When Avram Grant became the manager of the club, Basinas had continued to impress for Portsmouth when called upon and a poll among Portsmouth fans on 23 January 2010, showed that he's appreciated by the fans. 77% of fans believe that "Basinas has the creative touch and must play", while only 2% believed he should leave the club. With Portsmouth Angelos Basinas reached the 2010 FA Cup Final against Chelsea of Carlo Ancelotti.

Arles-Avignon
In the summer 2010, Angelos Basinas moved to Arles, with his teammate Angelos Charisteas, in the Ligue 1. He made his debut on 21 August 2010 in a 2–1 away defeat against Toulouse. Basinas made a total of five appearances in Ligue 1 and French Cup. The contract was broken two months later.

International career
Basinas won his first cap in a 3–1 win over El Salvador on 18 August 1999 and scored his first goal in just his second match, also against El Salvador just two days later. He has remained a part of the national team setup since his debut and has been a regular since Otto Rehhagel took over in 2001.

He was a key player in Greece's upset European Championship victory, scoring a penalty in his country's 2–1 upset win over host team Portugal in the tournament's opening game. Basinas was a vital player in the hard working midfield of the Greek team throughout the tournament. In the final, Charisteas scored the winning goal for Greece against Portugal off a corner kick by Basinas, which saw Greece win the trophy.

After Theodoros Zagorakis retired, Basinas was selected to take the captain's arm band. Basinas earned his 100th cap for Greece 1 April 2009 in a FIFA World Cup 2010 qualifier against Israel. At the time, he was only the second Greek player to achieve 100 national team appearances alongside Theodoros Zagorakis.

Career statistics

Club

International

Scores and results list Greece's goal tally first, score column indicates score after each Basinas goal.

Honours
Panathinaikos
Greek League: 1995–96, 2003–04
Greek Cup: 2003–04; runner-up 1997–98, 1998–99

Portsmouth
FA Cup: runner-up 2010

Greece U-21
UEFA European Under-21 Championship: runner-up 1998

Greece
European Championship: 2004

See also
List of footballers with more than 100 international caps

References

External links
 

1976 births
Living people
Greek footballers
Association football midfielders
La Liga players
AEK Athens F.C. players
RCD Mallorca players
Panathinaikos F.C. players
Portsmouth F.C. players
AC Arlésien players
UEFA Euro 2004 players
2005 FIFA Confederations Cup players
UEFA Euro 2008 players
UEFA European Championship-winning players
Greece international footballers
Greece under-21 international footballers
Super League Greece players
Premier League players
Ligue 1 players
FIFA Century Club
Footballers from Chalcis
Greek expatriate footballers
Greek expatriate sportspeople in Spain
Expatriate footballers in Spain
Greek expatriate sportspeople in England
Expatriate footballers in England
Greek expatriate sportspeople in France
Expatriate footballers in France